General Charles Murray Cathcart, 2nd Earl Cathcart  (21 December 1783 – 16 July 1859), styled Lord Greenock between 1814 and 1843, was a British Army general who became Governor General of the Province of Canada (26 November 1845 – 30 January 1847). He was a keen amateur geologist, with enough recognition to warrant being made a Fellow of the Royal Society of Edinburgh.

Early life
Cathcart was born at Walton, Essex, on 21 December 1783, the eldest surviving son of William Cathcart, 10th Lord Cathcart (later the 1st Earl Cathcart).

Career
Cathcart entered the army as a cornet in the 2nd Regiment of Life Guards on 2 March 1800. He served on the staff of Sir James Craig in Naples and Sicily. He became heir apparent to the lordship of Cathcart in 1804, after his brother William Cathcart, Master of Cathcart died while commanding a Royal Navy vessel in the West Indies. After his father was elevated to an earldom in 1814 he became known by the courtesy title Lord Greenock.

Cathcart saw service on the ill-fated Walcheren Expedition in 1809 and at the siege of Flushing, after which for some time he was disabled by the injurious effects of the pestilence which cut off so many thousands of his companions. Becoming lieutenant colonel on 30 August 1810, he embarked for the Peninsula, where he was present at the Battle of Barrosa, for which he received a gold medal on 6 April 1812, at the Battle of Salamanca, and the Battle of Vitoria, during which he served as assistant quartermaster-general.

He was next sent to assist Sir Thomas Graham in Holland as the head of the quartermaster-general's staff and was present at the ill-fated Siege of Bergen op Zoom in March 1814. Thereafter he was present at the Battle of Waterloo, where he had three horses shot from under him. He was awarded the Russian Order of St. Vladimir, the Dutch Military William Order, and made a Companion of the Order of the Bath (CB). In 1823, he was appointed a lieutenant colonel in the royal staff corps at Hythe.

In 1830 he moved to Edinburgh where lived at "Whitehouse villa" on Bruntsfield Links. He became involved in the proceedings of the Highland Society, became a Fellow of the Royal Society of Edinburgh and where he announced the discovery of a new mineral, a sulphide of cadmium, which was found in excavating the Bishopton tunnel near Port Glasgow and which is now known as Greenockite. On 17 February 1837 he was made Commander-in-Chief, Scotland and Governor of Edinburgh Castle. On 17 June 1838, on the death of his father, he became second earl and eleventh baron Cathcart. On 16 March 1846 he was appointed commander-in-chief in British North America from 16 March 1846 and in 1850 he was appointed to the command of the Northern and Midland District, and in 1855 he retired.

Family
On 30 September 1818 he married Henrietta Mather, daughter of Thomas Mather in France. The couple remarried at Portsea, England, 12 February 1819. Lady Cathcart accompanied her husband, and their daughters, to Canada in June, 1845. Lady Cathcart presented colours to one of the militia regiments in Montreal. The family returned to England in May, 1847.

Cathcart died at St. Leonard's-on-Sea on 16 July 1859. His wife died on 24 June 1872.

Publications
He was the author of two papers in the Transactions of the Royal Society of Edinburgh in 1836, On the Phenomena in the neighbourhood of Edinburgh of the Igneous Rocks in their relation to the Secondary Strata, and The Coal Formation of the Scottish Lowlands.

References

Sources

External links

|-
 

|-

|-

|-

|-

|-

11th Hussars officers
1783 births
1859 deaths
1st King's Dragoon Guards officers
3rd Dragoon Guards officers
British Army generals
British Army personnel of the French Revolutionary Wars
British Army personnel of the Napoleonic Wars
British Life Guards officers
Chancellors of the University of Toronto
Earls in the Peerage of the United Kingdom
Fellows of the Royal Society of Edinburgh
Governors-General of the Province of Canada
Knights Fourth Class of the Military Order of William
Knights Grand Cross of the Order of the Bath
People from Walton-on-the-Naze
Recipients of the Order of St. Vladimir, 4th class
Recipients of the Waterloo Medal
Royal Staff Corps officers
Military personnel from Essex